The 2018 OFC Champions League knockout stage was played from 7 April to 20 May 2018. A total of eight teams competed in the knockout stage to decide the champions of the 2018 OFC Champions League.

Qualified teams
The winners and runners-up of each of the four groups in the group stage advanced to the quarter-finals.

Format
The eight teams in the knockout stage played on a single-elimination basis. In the quarter-finals, each tie was played as a single match, while in the semi-finals and final, each tie was played on a home-and-away two-legged basis.

Bracket
The bracket was determined as follows:

The bracket was decided after the draw for the knockout stage (quarter-finals, semi-finals, and final) was held on 5 March 2018 at the OFC Headquarters in Auckland, New Zealand.

Schedule
The schedule of each round was as follows.

Quarter-finals
In the quarter-finals, the winners of one group played the runners-up of another group (teams from same group cannot play each other), with the group winners hosting the match, and the matchups decided by draw.

Semi-finals
In the semi-finals, the four quarter-final winners played in two ties, with the matchups and order of legs decided by draw.

Lautoka won 2–1 on aggregate.

2–2 on aggregate. Team Wellington won on away goals.

Final
In the final, the two semi-final winners played each other, with the order of legs decided by draw.

Team Wellington won 10–3 on aggregate.

References

External links
OFC Champions League 2018, oceaniafootball.com

3
April 2018 sports events in Oceania
May 2018 sports events in Oceania